He Jianming (simplified Chinese: 何建明; born 1956) is a Chinese non-fiction author.

Career 
He Jianming has published over 50 books, the majority of which are creative nonfiction works focusing on Chinese society from 1978, when Chinese economic reform process began, to the present day. He has won the Lu Xun Literary Prize three times. He is currently vice chair of the China Writers Association.

Writings 
He Jianming's publications include:
 The Country
 Fidelity and Betrayal
 Fundamental Interests
 Falling Tears are Gold
 Nanjing 1937: Memories of a Massacre (English translation)

References 

1956 births
Living people
People from Changshu
Writers from Suzhou
Members of the 12th Chinese People's Political Consultative Conference